Anomala hardyorum, or Hardys' dune beetle, is a species of shining leaf chafer in the family Scarabaeidae. It is endemic to the Algodones Dunes in North America.

References

Further reading

 
 

Rutelinae
Articles created by Qbugbot
Beetles described in 1976